The Sukhoi Su-10 or Izdeliye Ye was a Soviet turbojet-powered bomber aircraft built shortly after World War II.

Development
On 26 February 1946 OKB-134 was tasked  with developing and building a bomber powered by four Lyul'ka TR-1A or six RD-10 turbojet engines. Work began on 24 April 1946, with many different configurations studied before the design was frozen. 
Alternative powerplant arrangements were constantly studied and included:-

 4 x RD-10 (Jumo 004  copies)
 6 x RD-10 (Jumo 004  copies)
 4 x Lyul'ka TR-1
 4 x Lyul'ka TR-1A
 4 x Lyul'ka TR-2
 4 x RD-500 (Rolls-Royce Derwent copies)

The Su-10 was a multi-engined jet bomber with a crew of four comprising Pilot, Navigator/Bomb Aimer (usually the Commander of the aircraft), Gunner/Radio Operator, Gunner/Observer. Ejection seats were provided for the Pilot, Navigator and Radio Operator, the tail-gunner escaped after jettisoning the tail barbette.

The airframe was of all-metal semi-monocoque construction with flush-riveted stressed duralumin skinning and highly stressed parts made from high-strength steel. The cantilever shoulder-mounted wings were trapezoidal in plan-form with rounded wing-tips. Built in one piece, each wing was a two-spar structure with ribs and stressed duralumin skinning, using TsAGI Sh-2-12 airfoils at the root and SR-3-12 section at the tip. The tail unit comprised a 45-degree swept fin and un-swept tailplane at approx 2/3 fin span using TsAGI 1V-00 aerofoil sections. Ailerons and elevators were hydraulically boosted.

Mounted at approx half span, the engine nacelles were designed for minimum interference with the wing aerodynamics. The engines were arranged in vertically staggered pairs, with the lower engine completely clear of the leading edge, exhausting under the wing, whilst the upper engine nacelle carried over the wing, exhausting at approx half chord.

Construction of test rigs and a static test fuselage was carried out throughout 1947, and the final propulsion arrangement was settled by a Council of Ministers directive on 11 March 1947, calling for the development and construction of a medium bomber powered by four Lyul'ka TR-1A turbojets. To assist take-off the Su-10 could also use four U-5 JATO boosters fitted on the lower rear fuselage sides.

The first prototype was completed and ready for flight tests when the OKB was among many shut down at that time and all work stopped. The Su-10 was sent to the Moscow Aviation Institute for use as an instructional airframe.

Specifications (Su-10 / Izdeliye E)

See also

References

Su-10
1940s Soviet bomber aircraft
Abandoned military aircraft projects of the Soviet Union